Enlightened moderation is a term coined by a former Pakistani president, Pervez Musharraf; it applies to practicing a moderate Islam, as opposed to the interpretations of fundamentalist Islam.

To think properly as to rationalize thoughts, to be on the positive side of life and to prefer optimism, the theory goes, is to be against extremism.

The strategy of enlightened moderation was unveiled by Musharraf during the 2002 OIC Summit Conference in Malaysia.

Musharraf explained his position in an opinion piece that was published in various newspapers in 2004. His plan for enlightened moderation has two sides. It calls "for the Muslim world to shun militancy and extremism and adopt the path of socioeconomic uplift" and "for the West, and the United States in particular, to seek to resolve all political disputes with justice and to aid in the socioeconomic betterment of the deprived Muslim world".

Musharraf pointed out that moderation and enlightenment have been the traits of the Islamic world since the times of Muhammad.

Musharraf wrote:
I say to my brother Muslims: The time for renaissance has come. The way forward is through enlightenment. We must concentrate on human resource development through the alleviation of poverty and through education, health care and social justice. If this is our direction, it cannot be achieved through confrontation. We must adopt a path of moderation and a conciliatory approach to fight the common belief that Islam is a religion of militancy in conflict with modernization, democracy and secularism. All this must be done with a realization that, in the world we live in, fairness does not always rule.

Criticism
Fundamentalist Islamic organizations have criticized Musharraf's vision of enlightened moderation. The Jamaat-e-Islami condemns it as a neologism for Westernization and American imperialism. Islam is innately a religion of enlightened moderation, they argue, and needs no Westernized amendments. Masooda Bano points out that the US is not likely to "suddenly metamorphose into a benevolent entity, which will 'resolve all political disputes with justice.'"

References and notes

Further reading
 Compare and contrast to "Enlightened Underdevelopment." 1994. The Spirit and Power of Place: Human Environment and Sacrality: Essays Dedicated to Yi-Fu Tuan. In Rana P.B. Singh (ed.). Pps: 87-100. Varanasi, India: NGSI Publications No. 41. Concurrently published under same title in National Geographical Journal of India  40,1-4:87-100.

External links
 Jamaat-e-Islami "“Enlightened Moderation” Or The New US ‘Religious Order’" 

Liberalism in Pakistan
Pervez Musharraf
Political terminology in Pakistan
Liberal and progressive movements within Islam
Pakistan studies
Enlightenment philosophy
Pakistan Movement